Wilson Creek is a stream in Sauk County, Wisconsin, in the United States.

Wilson Creek was named for Thomas Wilson, a pioneer settler.

See also
List of rivers of Wisconsin

References

Rivers of Sauk County, Wisconsin
Rivers of Wisconsin